John Mese (born November 4, 1963) is an American actor, producer, director, and writer. He has had roles in numerous films and television shows. Credited appearances on television include: Rizzoli & Isles, Suits, Castle, The Mentalist, Weeds, Monk, Law & Order, Boomtown, Without a Trace, The X Files, and Sex in the City. Mese is also the writer of a children's book series that was featured in the March 2009 issue of Kiplinger's Personal Finance magazine.

Early life and education

John Mese was born and raised in Baton Rouge, Louisiana. He finished secondary education at Catholic High School and went on to earn a Master of Fine Arts (MFA) from Louisiana State University, where he was a member of the Sigma Chi fraternity and performed in a number of LSU Theatre productions. In 1986, he was a finalist in the "Face of the '80s" contest organized by Ford Models and GQ Magazine.

Career

Theatre
At LSU, he acted in several theater productions, to name a few: The Tooth of Crime in 1986, in which he played Hoss; Sly Fox in 1982, and Death of a Salesman in 1986. He played "Treat" in Lyle Kessler's play Orphans. He played Alvaro Mangiacavallo in the LSU Theatre main stage production of The Rose Tattoo, directed by John Dennis in 1987.

He has the title role in an acclaimed one-man show written by Champ Clark, Wild Son: The Testimony of Christian Brando, which premiered at the Santa Monica Playhouse in 2019 and was praised by Pulitzer Prize-winning playwright Beth Henley. Wild Son is based on face-to-face interviews between the journalist Champ Clark and Christian Brando before the latter's death in 2008. The show was performed at Bistro Byronz, a restaurant chain in Baton Rouge, LA, on June 19th, 2022. The show ran at the Edinburgh Festival Fringe from August 15-20, 2022.

Film
Mese had the starring role as Richard Broderick in the film Noise in the Middle (2020), also starring Tara Buck as Richard’s deceased wife. He played Augie in King of Herrings (2013), an indie film directed by Eddie Jemison and also starring Mese's fellow LSU alumnus Joe Chrest. Mese played "Crow" in Derek Sitter's award-winning short, Bugtussle (2022). Bugtussle was recognized by the Accolade Global Film Competition for "Awards of Merit" in August 2022, notably for Leading Actor (Mese), Supporting Actor (Sitter), Film Short, Script/Writer (Sitter), Original Score, composed by James Hutchens and Johnny Bourbon.

Television
Mese was featured alongside Mark Harmon and Frederic Lehne in a Lili Fini Zanuck-directed production called "We Have Cleared the Tower," in which Mese played the role of Donn Eisele of the Apollo 7 mission; Harmon played Wally Schirra, and Lehne played Walt Cunningham. Mese was a cast member for Episode 1 ("Can We Do This?") and Episode 3 ("We Have Cleared The Tower") of From the Earth to the Moon (1998). His "first big job" for television was in 1992 as the love interest of Marlee Matlin on Reasonable Doubts. Prior to that, his TV roles (on shows like The Fanelli Boys, Matlock, and Northern Exposure) were relatively minor. In 2000, Mese played Sheriff Phil Adderly on Chimera (The X-Files), one of the "Monster of the Week" episodes in the seventh season of The X Files.

Writing
Mese and his wife, Dawn Kelsey, are the authors of a children's book series called Flippy and Friends, which includes board books, paperback, and hardcover books. In 2017, Mese penned an editorial for the entertainment section of Purple Clover; this was an autobiographical sketch about boyhood fantasy, titled "My First Playboy."

Awards
 Best Acting Performance, Oregon Short Film Festival, Winter 2023 edition

References

External links 
 @mesejohn Twitter (official)
 John Mese on Vimeo (official)

1963 births
Living people
Male actors from Baton Rouge, Louisiana
Louisiana State University alumni
Catholic High School (Baton Rouge, Louisiana) alumni
Film producers from Louisiana
American male stage actors
Writers from Baton Rouge, Louisiana
American writers of Italian descent
American people of Italian descent